Carabinae is a subfamily of ground beetles in the family Carabidae. There are about 10 genera and more than 1,400 described species in Carabinae.

Genera
These 10 genera belong to the subfamily Carabinae:
 Tribe Carabini Linnaeus, 1802
 Genus Aplothorax G.R.Waterhouse, 1842
 Genus Calosoma Weber, 1801
 Genus Carabus Linnaeus, 1758
 Genus Ceroglossus Solier, 1848
 Tribe Cychrini Perty, 1830
 Genus Cychropsis Boileau, 1901
 Genus Cychrus Fabricius, 1794
 Genus Scaphinotus Dejean, 1826
 Genus Sphaeroderus Dejean, 1826
 Genus Maoripamborus Brookes, 1944
 Genus Pamborus Latreille, 1812

References

 
Carabidae subfamilies